Datatilsynet may refer to:

 Danish Data Protection Agency
 Norwegian Data Protection Authority